Emil Constantinescu (born 19 November 1939) is a Romanian professor and politician, who served as the President of Romania, from 1996 to 2000.

After the Romanian Revolution of 1989, Constantinescu became a founding member and vice president of the Civic Alliance (AC). In addition, he also served as the acting president of the Democratic Romanian Anti-Totalitarian Forum, the first associative structure of the democratic opposition in post-1989 Romania, which was later transformed into a centre-right political and electoral alliance known as the Romanian Democratic Convention (CDR).

Biography

Early life and education

Professional career

Political career and presidency
In 1992 the CDR, of which the PNȚ-CD was a member and most important constituent political party, nominated him as its candidate for presidency. He subsequently lost the election to then incumbent Ion Iliescu after the second round of the 1992 Romanian general election. In 1996, he competed once again for the presidency as the CDR's candidate and managed to defeat Iliescu in the second round, securing a victory by a margin of roughly 10%. CDR's success in the 1996 general election marked the first peaceful transition of power in post-1989 Romania. On the day he took office, he suspended his membership from the PNȚ-CD, as the Constitution precludes a president holding formal membership of a political party during his term(s).

Throughout his sole four-year term, Constantinescu struggled with the ineffective implementation of the processes of privatization, which, bogged down by excessive bureaucracy, increased unemployment and poverty in the short term. After another two Mineriads which took place in 1999 (one in January and the other in February), culminating with the arrest of Miron Cozma, the remainder of his term suffered a political crisis between the majority parties that, at the time, formed the governing coalition (i.e. CDR, PD, PSDR, and UDMR/RMDSZ). The country was further damaged by a drought in 2000. At the end of his term in 2000, he decided not to run for re-election, stating that the system had defeated him.

After the presidency 

Constantinescu's presidency along with CDR's governance were marred by an economic recession. Despite this, his presidency has been eventually credited with putting an end to the Mineriads, a reform of the banking system as well as with the attraction of the first major foreign investments in Romania after 1989. With dashed expectations of an immediate improvement in daily life, Romanians exhibited strong disillusionment with the major parties and politicians of the CDR at the end of the 1996–2000 legislature, with the Greater Romania Party (PRM) subsequently gaining the second place in the 2000 legislative election.

A disenchanted Emil Constantinescu, who lost popularity and had failed to fulfil his reformist agenda announced on 17 July 2000 that he would not run for a second term. He temporarily withdrew from political life at the end of his term in November 2000. Constantinescu's direction in foreign affairs continued however after the comeback of Ion Iliescu in 2000. Eventually, Romania joined NATO in 2004 and the European Union (EU) three years later, in 2007, alongside Bulgaria.

The former president returned to the political scene in 2002 as head of the People's Action (AP; Acţiunea Populară) party, which subsequently merged within the National Liberal Party (PNL) in 2008.

Constantinescu has occasionally criticized the policies of the 2004–2014 president, Traian Băsescu, accusing him of authoritarian tendencies, and supported Crin Antonescu in the first round of the 2009 presidential elections.

Nowadays, he still remains heavily involved in politics through working for many NGOs, both in Romania and internationally. Emil Constantinescu is the current president of the Association of Citizenship Education, of the Romanian Foundation for Democracy and also the founding president of the Institute for Regional Cooperation and Conflict Prevention (INCOR).

A frequent speaker at the Oslo Freedom Forum, in 2010 he presented the OFF with a presidential medal. He is also a member of the international advisory council of the Victims of Communism Memorial Foundation.

Honours and awards

National honours 
 : 
 Order of the Star of Romania, 1st Class
 Emblema de Onoare a Armatei României ("The Romanian Army's Badge of Honor") – 24 October 2012

Foreign honours 

 : Order of the White Rose of Finland (1998)
 : Order of Merit of the Austrian Republic (1999)
 : Order of St. Olav (1999)
 : Order of the State of Republic of Turkey (1999)
 : Order of the Elephant (2000)
 : Grand Cross (or 1st Class) of the Order of the White Double Cross (2000)
 : Grand Order of King Tomislav (2000)
 : Honorary Knight of the Order of St Michael and St George (2000)
 : Order of Prince Henry (2000)
 : Order of Prince Yaroslav the Wise (2000)

Electoral history

Presidential elections

External links

References

Bibliography 
 Ion Alexandrescu, Stan Stoica, România după 1989. Mică enciclopedie, Editura Meronia, București, 2005
 Tom Gallagher, Furtul unei națiuni. România de la communism încoace, Editura Humanitas, București, 2004
 Dan Pavel, Iulia Huia, "Nu putem reuși decît împreună." O istorie analitică a Convenției Democratice, 1989–2000, Editura Polirom, Iași, 2003

1939 births
Living people
Romanian people of Moldovan descent
People from Bender, Moldova
Presidents of Romania
Christian Democratic National Peasants' Party politicians
University of Bucharest alumni
Academic staff of the University of Bucharest
Rectors of the University of Bucharest
Romanian geologists
Eastern Orthodox Christians from Romania
Members of the Romanian Orthodox Church
Honorary Knights Grand Cross of the Order of St Michael and St George
Recipients of the Grand Star of the Decoration for Services to the Republic of Austria
Recipients of the Order of Prince Yaroslav the Wise, 1st class
Grand Crosses of the Order of the Dannebrog
Recipients of the Order of Michael the Brave
First Class of the Order of the Star of Romania
Mineriads